The Commonwealth Handball Association (CHA) is the governing body for the Olympic sport of handball (also known as European Handball or Olympic Handball) in the British Commonwealth.

History
Originally set up in Salford (England) 1985 to try to get Handball into the Commonwealth Games, the CHA has grown to 34 member nations. The aim was to attain greater recognition for the English language speaking nations within the IHF; represent the interest of Commonwealth nations within the IHF; develop technical expertise through coaching and refereeing; promote friendship through competitions; promote handball throughout the Commonwealth; get handball into the Commonwealth Games as a team sport.

CHA Secretaries General

Member Nations

 Australia
 Bangladesh
 Botswana
 Cameroon
 Canada
 Cook Islands
 Cyprus
 England
 Fiji
 Gambia
 Ghana
 Hong Kong, China
 India
 Kenya
 Kiribati
 Lesotho
 Malawi
 Mozambique
 New Zealand
 Nigeria
 Pakistan
 Papua New Guinea
 Rwanda
 Samoa
 Scotland
 Seychelles
 Sierra Leone
 Singapore
 Solomon Islands
 South Africa
 Tanzania
 Uganda
 Zambia
 Zimbabwe

References

Handball governing bodies
Handball